The Armorial of local councils in Scotland lists 46 heraldic coats of arms organised according to type of council, whether Regional, Island, City District, or Other. Each entry includes the name of the geographic area represented and an blazon (description in highly stylised heraldic language). Many entries include a mention of the shield supporter(s) and an image of the herald; some include a motto.

Current

Councils
There are 32 council areas in Scotland, each controlled by a  council which is the local government authority.

Regional Councils 1973-1996
A heraldic template was set for all of these councils comprising a special coronet (a circlet richly chased from which are issuant four thistles leaved (one and two halves visible) Or) and sinister supporter (a unicorn argent). The Strathclyde council was never granted arms.

Island Councils (1973-1996)
The island councils used the same supporter but their crown was four dolphins two and two respectant naiant (two visible) Or.

City District Councils (1973-1995)
The city district council crown was a circlet richly chased from which were issuant eight thistle heads (three and two halves visible) Or.

Other District Councils (1973-1995)
There were District Councils within the regions.

References

Armorials of the United Kingdom
Local government in Scotland
Scotland-related lists